Zach Abey is an American football quarterback who attended the United States Naval Academy. He played quarterback and wide receiver for the Navy Midshipmen football team.

College career

2015 season
Abey entered the 2015 season as the fourth string quarterback, sitting behind Keenan Reynolds, Tago Smith, and Will Worth. He did not make a single in game appearance in 2015.

2016 season

Abey began the 2016 season sitting behind Smith and Worth, but moved to second string after Smith suffered a season-ending injury in the season opener against Fordham and Worth became the starter. He appeared in the games the team played against East Carolina and SMU, performing mop-up duty during the large Navy wins. During the 2016 American Athletic Conference Football Championship Game, Worth injured his foot and Abey took over for the rest of the game. The Midshipmen lost 34–10 to the Temple Owls. Abey was the starter for the Army–Navy Game, where the Midshipmen lost 21–17 to their arch rival the Army Black Knights for the first time since 2001. He also started for the 2016 Armed Forces Bowl, where Navy lost 48–45 to Louisiana Tech.

2017 season
Abey, now a junior, earned the spot of starting quarterback. In his third career start against Florida Atlantic, Abey rushed for 200 yards and passed for 100 yards. This achievement made it the first time in Naval Academy history that a Midshipmen quarterback has done so in a single game. He was named the AAC Co-Offensive Player of the Week.

Through the first five weeks of the 2017 season, Abey ranked fifth among all Division I FBS players with 656 rushing yards. Despite the Midshipmen starting the season 5–0, Abey began showing signs of struggling with reading defenses and pitching the ball on perimeter option players (forcing him to instead run up the middle through the line of scrimmage). In October, he suffered a concussion against UCF and a shoulder injury against Temple. Slotback Malcolm Perry replaced him at quarterback with the exceptions of the Notre Dame (injury to Perry) and Houston (moved back to slotback) games. Perry was eventually named the starter for the Military Bowl against Virginia. With his benching, Abey was considered for a fullback role, though head coach Ken Niumatalolo opted to keep him at quarterback as the backup.

In the Military Bowl, Abey recorded 88 rushing yards as part of a Navy bowl-record 452 total yards on the ground, along with a bowl-high five rushing touchdowns, becoming the first player to score five rushing touchdowns in an FBS bowl game since Kareem Hunt in 2015. He was named the game's Most Valuable Player.

Abey concluded the 2017 season with 1,413 rushing yards, the second highest in school history behind Napoleon McCallum's 1,587 in 1983.

2018 season
Perry became the permanent starting quarterback for the 2018 season, while Abey was moved to wide receiver. After starting six games at receiver and missing the game against Air Force with a knee injury, Abey became the backup quarterback against Houston behind Garret Lewis when Perry moved to slotback. Abey returned to the starting quarterback role against Cincinnati.

Navy ended the season 3–10.

Statistics

Post-college career
After graduating from the Naval Academy in May 2019, Abey was an assistant coach for the Midshipmen through the 2019 season before serving as a second lieutenant in the United States Marine Corps.

References

Year of birth missing (living people)
Living people
American football quarterbacks
Navy Midshipmen football players
Place of birth missing (living people)